In enzymology, a tRNA (adenine-N6-)-methyltransferase is an enzyme that catalyzes the chemical reaction

S-adenosyl-L-methionine + tRNA  S-adenosyl-L-homocysteine + tRNA containing N6-methyladenine

Thus, the two substrates of this enzyme are S-adenosyl methionine and tRNA, whereas its two products are S-adenosylhomocysteine and tRNA containing N6-methyladenine.

This enzyme belongs to the family of transferases, specifically those transferring one-carbon group methyltransferases.  The systematic name of this enzyme class is S-adenosyl-L-methionine:tRNA (adenine-N6-)-methyltransferase. This enzyme is also called S-adenosyl-L-methionine:tRNA (adenine-6-N-)-methyltransferase.

References

 
 
 

EC 2.1.1
Enzymes of unknown structure